During World War II, a joint friendship proclamation was created between the Kingdom of Romania, the Independent State of Croatia and the Slovak Republic against any further Hungarian expansion. Ion Antonescu, the Marshal of Romania, engaged in some intra-Axis diplomacy and created the alliance in May 1942. The union was similar to the interbellic Little Entente.

Later in the war, Slovak troops and Croatian naval and air units operated together from Romanian soil. In June, the Hungarians responded with a particularly blatant cross-border raid at Turda, near Cluj; one of ten clashes that month. Matters had gone too far for Hitler, who brought pressure to bear on Antonescu and Miklós Horthy to gain their public recognition that the Second Vienna Award was irrevocable. On 1 August 1942, Antonescu fudged the issue by announcing he would make no territorial claims until after the war, but in private, he never ceased to press Hitler for the return of Northern Transylvania.

Gallery

See also 
 Latin Axis (World War II)
 Little Entente
 Balkan Pact
 Polish–Romanian alliance
 Balkan Pact (1953)

References 

Croatia in World War II
Politics of World War II
1942 documents
Romania in World War II
Slovakia during World War II